Panometer or Asisi Panometer may refer to:

Dresden Panometer
Leipzig Panometer